Andrzej Pałasz (born 22 July 1960 in Zabrze) is a retired Polish professional football player.

Club career
He played mostly for Górnik Zabrze and later also briefly for Hannover 96 in Germany.

Pałasz had a spell in the Turkish Süper Lig with Bursaspor.

International career
Pałasz played for the Polish national team (35 matches/7 goals) and was a participant at the 1982 FIFA World Cup, where Poland won the bronze medal and at the 1986 FIFA World Cup.

Pałasz also played at the 1979 FIFA World Youth Championship in Japan.

References

External links
 

1960 births
Living people
Polish footballers
Polish expatriate footballers
Górnik Zabrze players
Hannover 96 players
Bursaspor footballers
Ekstraklasa players
Bundesliga players
Süper Lig players
Expatriate footballers in West Germany
Expatriate footballers in Turkey
Poland youth international footballers
Poland international footballers
1982 FIFA World Cup players
1986 FIFA World Cup players
Sportspeople from Zabrze
Association football midfielders